Scapozygocera quadriplagiata is a species of beetle in the family Cerambycidae. It was described by Stephan von Breuning in 1947. It is known from Papua New Guinea.

Subspecies
 Scapozygocera quadriplagiata quadriplagiata Breuning, 1947
 Scapozygocera quadriplagiata aruensis Breuning, 1959

References

Zygocerini
Beetles described in 1947